Thomas John Joseph Paprocki (born August 5, 1952) is an American prelate of the Roman Catholic Church who has been serving as bishop of the Diocese of Springfield in Illinois since 2010.  He previously served as an auxiliary bishop of the Archdiocese of Chicago in Illinois from 2003 to 2010.

Biography

Early life 
The third of nine children, Thomas Paprocki was born August 5, 1952, in Chicago, Illinois; he has six brothers and two sisters. A lifelong fan of hockey—who is sometimes referred to in the media as the "Holy Goalie"—he began playing at a young age in the basement of his father's drugstore and supports the Chicago Blackhawks professional hockey team. He graduated from Quigley Preparatory Seminary South in Chicago in 1970, and then entered Niles College in Chicago, where he obtained a Bachelor of Arts degree in 1974.

From 1974 to 1979, Paprocki studied at St. Mary of the Lake Seminary in Mundelein, Illinois, where he earned a Bachelor's in Sacred Theology (1976), Master's in Divinity (1978), and Licentiate in Sacred Theology (1979).

Priesthood 
Paprocki was ordained to the priesthood  for the Archdiocese of Chicago by Cardinal John Cody on May 10, 1978. Paprocki then served as associate pastor at St. Michael's Parish in South Chicago until 1983. In 1981, he earned his Juris Doctor from DePaul University College of Law in Chicago and founded the Chicago Legal Clinic to assist the working poor and disadvantaged.

Paprocki served as administrator of St. Joseph Parish in Chicago from 1983 to 1986 and as vice-chancellor of the archdiocese from 1985 to 1987. He then furthered his studies in Rome at the Pontifical Gregorian University, where he obtained a Licentiate of Canon Law (1989) and a Doctor of Canon Law degree (1991). Upon his return to Chicago, Paprocki was named chancellor of the archdiocese in 1992 and later pastor of St. Constance Pastor in 2000. In 2013, he received an MBA from the University of Notre Dame in Notre Dame, Indiana.

Auxiliary Bishop of Chicago 
On January 24, 2003, Paprocki was appointed auxiliary bishop of the Archdiocese of Chicago and titular bishop of Vulturaria by Pope John Paul II. He received his episcopal consecration on March 19, 2003, from Cardinal Francis George, with bishops Raymond E. Goedert and Ricardo Urquidi serving as co-consecrators. As an auxiliary bishop, Paprocki served as episcopal vicar for Vicariate IV, and as the cardinal's liaison for Polonia and for health and hospital affairs. Paprocki is also a board member of the Polish American Association and the Polish American Leadership Initiative.

When Illinois Governor Rod Blagojevich, issued an executive order in 2005 requiring all pharmacists in the state to dispense prescription contraceptives, Paprocki condemned the order in Blagojevich's presence, saying, "I am dismayed that our secular society has reached the point that individuals are being required by law to violate their personal religious beliefs in order to accommodate the selfish demands of special interest groups."In November 2008, Paprocki said, "If Catholic hospitals were required by federal law to perform abortions, we'd have to close our hospitals." When remarking about who was responsible for the sexual abuse crises in the Catholic Church, Paprocki said that the devil was the principal force behind the lawsuits.Paprocki has shielded at least three priests from sexual assault investigations.

Bishop of Springfield 
On April 20, 2010, Paprocki was appointed as bishop of the Diocese of Springfield in Illinois by Pope Benedict XVI. He was installed at the Cathedral of the Immaculate Conception in Springfield on June 22, 2010. In November 2010, he organized a conference on exorcism.

In April 2012, Paprocki was named as part of a three-member board of American Catholic Bishops charged by the Vatican's Congregation for the Doctrine of the Faith (CDF) with a multi-year investigation into the U.S. Leadership Conference of Women Religious (LCWR). He coined the name of the Fortnight for Freedom, a campaign of the American bishops on behalf of religious liberty.

Paprocki is episcopal board chair for the Catholic Athletes for Christ, and is the author of Running for a Higher Purpose and Holy Goals for Body and Soul.

Viewpoints

Politics 
In September 2012, Paprocki wrote a column in his diocese's Catholic Times newspaper about the upcoming US presidential elections. He declared that voting for a candidate who promotes actions or behaviors that are "intrinsically evil and gravely sinful" makes one "morally complicit" and places the eternal salvation of the soul in "serious jeopardy." His article went on at length discussing how in his view the Democratic Party embraced objectionable doctrines, such as abortion rights for women and same-sex marriage. Paprocki took notice of the Republican Party's support for capital punishment in murder cases, stating that this did not directly conflict with Church teaching. He also argued that party differences over caring for the poor and immigration were "prudential judgments about the most effective means of achieving morally desirable ends, not intrinsic evils."

Ahead of the 2016 elections, Paprocki denounced the Democratic Party for its "aggressive pro-abortion stance and activist agenda expanding lesbian, gay, bisexual, and transgender rights," adding that Republicans "have not fared very well in these same areas." He wrote that Democrats, who "articulate strong concern for the poor," have made little progress in fighting poverty. Paprocki said that Catholics could choose not to vote for either Vice President Hillary Clinton or Donald Trump.

Communion for politicians
In February 2018, Paprocki officially upheld a previous decision to bar U.S. Senator Dick Durbin, a Catholic in his diocese, from receiving the Eucharist after Durbin voted against a 20-week abortion ban. He made the following statement:

"In April 2004, Sen. Durbin's pastor, then Msgr. Kevin Vann (now Bishop Kevin Vann of Orange, CA), said that he would be reticent to give Sen. Durbin Holy Communion because his pro-abortion position put him outside of communion or unity with the Church's teachings on life.  My predecessor, now Archbishop George Lucas of Omaha, said that he would support that decision. I have continued that position. The provision is intended not to punish, but to bring about a change of heart."On June 6, 2019, Paprocki issued a decree officially barring Illinois House Speaker Michael Madigan and Illinois Senate President John Cullerton, both Catholics, from presenting themselves to receive the eucharist.  Paprocki said the degree was on account of their role in passing the Reproductive Health Act, which removes spousal consent and waiting periods for abortions. While singling out Madigan and Cullerton specifically, Paprocki also asked that other legislators who voted for the bill not present themselves for communion either, stating that they had "cooperated in evil and committed grave sin." Madigan stated that Paprocki had informed him earlier that he would be forbidden from taking the sacrament if he permitted the House to debate and vote on the measure, but that he chose to do so.

Same-sex marriage
In November 2013, Paprocki said that Satan was behind recent Illinois legalization of same-sex marriage and held an exorcism ceremony, during which he read the exorcism rite "in reparation for the sin of same-sex marriage".

On June 23, 2017 Paprocki instructed priests in his diocese to "deny Communion, last rites and funeral rites to people in same-sex marriages – unless they repent". He prohibited clergy and parish staff from either performing same-sex marriages or allowing wedding receptions to be hosted in any facilities or centres owned by the Catholic church. This was followed by strong criticism. Author Michael Sean Winters of the National Catholic Reporter called for Paprocki to be "sacked." Christopher Pett, president of DignityUSA, described the decree as "mean-spirited and hurtful in the extreme." Paprocki defended his position as "a rather straightforward application of existing Church teaching and canon law."

Paprocki has been critical of the Jesuit priest James Martin, whose outreach to the LGBT community has drawn opposition from conservative Catholics. According to Paprocki, Martin "correctly expresses God’s love for all people, while on the other, he either encourages or fails to correct behavior that separates a person from that very love. This is deeply scandalous in the sense of leading people to believe that wrongful behavior is not sinful."

Worker's rights
Paprocki dissented from the amicus brief filed by the USCCB in support of labor unions in the Janus case. The bishops had affirmed the Church's traditional teaching in support for unions, citing various Church documents. Paprocki disagreed with the amicus brief. He instead supported the mandatory open shop for public employers. Paprocki has not been a visitor or spiritual guide at union halls but has collaborated with Legatus, an organization of Catholic corporate executives.  He has also preached for lawyers and MBA executives.

Although Paprocki did support the Janus ruling and respectfully rejected an amicus brief by the United States Conference of Catholic Bishops (USCCB), Paprocki claimed he did so in order to defend the conscience of the Catholic worker. Paprocki asserts that some labor unions support anti-Catholic stances; therefore, his approach defends the right of the worker to not support these groups. This distinction makes his opposition merely conditional; unions that are not contrary to Catholic teaching are not ruled out Ipso facto. Paprocki cites Pope Leo XIII's critical encyclical Rerum novarum paragraph 57 in order to show that although the Church has supported unions, said support has never been unconditional:"To sum up, then, We may lay it down as a general and lasting law that working men's associations should be so organized and governed as to furnish the best and most suitable means for attaining what is aimed at, that is to say, for helping each individual member to better his condition to the utmost in body, soul, and property. It is clear that they must pay special and chief attention to the duties of religion and morality, and that social betterment should have this chiefly in view; otherwise they would lose wholly their special character, and end by becoming little better than those societies which take no account whatever of religion. What advantage can it be to a working man to obtain by means of a society material well-being, if he endangers his soul for lack of spiritual food?"

Sexual abuse scandal
In response to 2018 allegations by Archbishop Carlo Maria Viganò that Pope Francis covered up allegations of sexual abuse against former-cardinal Theodore McCarrick, Paprocki called on all Vatican officials, including Francis, to "make public the pertinent files indicating who knew what and when...and provide the accountability that the Holy Father has promised." Paprocki criticized Pope Francis for declining to answer a question about whether or not the accusations were true, saying, "Frankly, but with all due respect, that response is not adequate."

Paprocki called for "public prayers of repentance and acts of atonement" after reports of widespread sexual abuse and coverup in the Catholic Church.

COVID-19 vaccines
After the University of Notre Dame announced a vaccine requirement for students in April 2021, Paprocki and Notre Dame Law Professor Gerard Bradley spoke out against the requirement. In a letter to campus newspaper The Observer, Paprocki and Bradley cited a statement from the Vatican's Congregation for the Doctrine of the Faith arguing that "persons may — not must — get vaccinated." They also requested, in light of vaccine testing on stem cell lines derived from aborted fetuses, that "Notre Dame should expand its understanding of 'religious' objectors to include those whose refusal to be vaccinated are rooted in moral considerations or other objections of conscience."

As Bishop of Springfield, Paprocki subsequently rejected vaccine requirements for clergy and employees within his diocese. He did, however, emphasize that "each person has a moral duty to act responsibly out of concern for his or her neighbor by diligently following other safety measures," irrespective of vaccination status.

Liturgy
Paprocki criticized Traditionis custodes, a July 2021 motu proprio issued by Pope Francis which imposed restrictions on the Tridentine Mass, the Mass commonly offered before the reforms of the Second Vatican Council in the 1960s and which still takes place in some churches. "My assessment of this is that it was ill-advised," he said. "I don't know who was advising him. But to the extent he was trying to solve a problem here, the motu proprio stirred things up." Paprocki continued to allow parishes in his diocese to offer the older form of the Mass.

Coat of arms

See also

 Catholic Church hierarchy
 Catholic Church in the United States
 Historical list of the Catholic bishops of the United States
 List of Catholic bishops of the United States
 Lists of patriarchs, archbishops, and bishops

References

External links

 Roman Catholic Diocese of Springfield in Illinois — official site

Episcopal succession

 
 

1952 births
Living people
Clergy from Chicago
Illinois lawyers
Loyola University Chicago alumni
University of Saint Mary of the Lake alumni
Pontifical Gregorian University alumni
American people of Polish descent
21st-century Roman Catholic bishops in the United States
Roman Catholic Archdiocese of Chicago
Roman Catholic bishops of Springfield in Illinois
Notre Dame Law School faculty